Ohonua is the capital of the Eua district in Tonga. It is located on the western side of the island. The population is 1,289.

References

Populated places in Eua